Prince Ra-Man is a fictional comic book magician published by DC Comics. Mark Merlin first appeared in House of Secrets #23 (August 1959), and was created by Mort Meskin. Prince Ra-Man first appeared in House of Secrets #73  (July 1965), and was created by Jack Miller and Bernard Baily.

Fictional character biography
Also known as the Mind Master, he was actually a Doctor Strange-style 'replacement' for a previous long-running series character in House of Secrets named Mark Merlin. A blue suit and black bow tie-clad supernatural detective who lived in the small suburban hamlet of "Cloister" in a mansion on "Mystery Hill" that he had inherited from a stage magician uncle of the same name, Mark Merlin used its vast collection of occult literature and artifacts to battle those who would use the occult for evil ends with the assistance of his beautiful blond secretary/fiancee Elsa Magusson and his black cat Memakata who he found in the tomb of a pharaoh of the same name and whose body he could transfer his mind into with the help of an ancient cat-headed amulet.

When Mark Merlin is banished to the other-dimensional lost world of Ra by the lizard-masked villain the Gargoyle, using the mystic oil lamp of Imhotep he gains mind over matter powers from an emerald-like six-sided jewel that represents the strange hexagonal green sun that hangs above the ancient Egyptian-style realm and which grants all who dwell there immortality. However, he cannot return to Earth in his own body, so the kindly Kranak, a scientist-sorcerer who had led his persecuted peace-loving followers to the alien refuge of Ra over 4000 years ago, uses a potion to reincarnate Merlin's spirit and memories in the body and brain of a long-dead young wizard named Prince Ra-Man, a hero whom ancient legends proclaimed as the son of the sun god for whom their pyramided planetoid was named. The reborn Ra-Man is able to go to Earth in his place and defeat the Gargoyle with his mighty "mental beam" which gives him control over virtually all non-living matter, allowing him to telekinetically levitate objects and to transform stone, metal and even the air itself into other shapes and forms under his command.

Although he longed to return to the peaceful paradise of Ra and Kranak's lovely dark-haired daughter Rimah, the bearded and brooding Ra-Man moved into the mansion, telling Elsa that Mark was dead, and vowed to continue his predecessor's work against the forces of evil. Riding around on his flying carpet-like six-sided green 'sun-disc' armed with his magic gem and an encyclopedic knowledge of black magic, he fought such arcane antagonists as the Heap (no relation to any of the other comic book creatures of the same name) and Lord Leopard and twice battled the evil Eclipso, another House of Secrets regular. The "Prince Ra-Man" feature ended in House of Secrets #80 (September–October 1966).

The "Whatever Happened To Mark Merlin and Prince Ra-Man" backup story in DC Comics Presents #32 (April 1981) finally has Ra-Man reveal his full origin and true connection with Mark Merlin to Elsa whom he had kept it a secret from in the original series, with the Mind Master having been accidentally trapped in Memakata's body after a battle with Merlin's old archenemy Doctor-7 in the years since then. Prince Ra-Man would later be killed in the last issue of Crisis on Infinite Earths. The only panel in which he appeared was his death scene, which was witnessed by the original Shade, the Changing Man.

Later appearances
Ra-Man made a cameo appearance in Grant Morrison's run on Animal Man. He reappeared along with all the other characters who were killed in the Crisis, but the only parts of him that appeared where those that had not been destroyed by the antimatter wave. He appeared stuck on the wall in Arkham Asylum, begging for help.

An aged, retired Mark Merlin appeared briefly in Ed Brubaker's run on the Detective Comics series. Whether this indicates that Mark survived the death of the Ra-Man body or that his death has been retconned is unknown. Batman speaks highly of Merlin's former detective skills and seeks his aid in a case involving the actor-turned-supervillain, the Charlatan.

In Grant Morrison's Seven Soldiers of Victory, Zatanna met a floating fakir-like pale green-skinned, balding and big-headed being known as King Ra-Man in the process of investigating the coming Sheeda menace. It is unclear if he is the same person as Prince Ra-Man or another more alien entity from his home dimension which is now referred to as the Interreality of Ra. He vowed that he would assume his 'Wrathful Battle Aspect' and fight the Sheeda. The 'six-sided sun jewel' of the original Ra-Man has now been replaced by the actual cube-shaped sun which, he points out, only looks hexagonal from a distance, which shines over Ra-Man's extra-dimensional realm as the direct source of his powers.

Mark Merlin's widow Elsa and Memakata reappear in Aquaman: Sword of Atlantis in the sea fortress Windward Home along with Dane Dorrance of the Sea Devils and Jim Lockhart, the Red Torpedo. In the Reign In Hell limited series, Prince Ra-Man is one of the leaders of the rebellion in Purgatory, Blaze and Satanus's "Secretary of State" in the armies of Hell. Mark Merlin, no longer dead, appears in Superman #690 and #692, asking the help of Zachary Zatara to find Prince Ra-Man. Mark Merlin appears in a flashback in Xombi vol. 2 #2, in which he teamed up with Sargon the Sorcerer, Julian Parker, and Rabbi Sinnowitz to imprison a powerful magical creature.

After DC Rebirth, he appears as one of the magical characters refusing to be hired by Henry Bendix to kill Midnighter and Apollo.

References

External links
DCU Guide: Prince Ra-Man
Mark Merlin/Prince Ra-Man at Mike's Amazing World of Comics
Mark Merlin at Don Markstein's Toonopedia. Archived from the original on February 13, 2016.

Comics characters introduced in 1959
Comics characters introduced in 1965
DC Comics characters who use magic
DC Comics fantasy characters
DC Comics superheroes
DC Comics supervillains
DC Comics characters who have mental powers
DC Comics telekinetics 
Fictional characters with elemental transmutation abilities